Dragutin Franasović, was a Serbian army general and politician who held the post of Minister of Defence and Minister of Foreign Affairs. In 1899 he succeeded General Stevan Zdravković as president of The Red Cross of Serbia, a post he held until the beginning of the Great War when Milos Borisavljevic took over. Franasović also served as the Chancellor of the Royal Orders from 1903 to 1905.

See also
 Ministry of Defence
 Tihomilj Nikolić
 Milojko Lešjanin
 Đura Horvatović
 Jovan Belimarković
 Božidar Janković

References

1842 births
1914 deaths
Government ministers of Serbia
19th-century Serbian people
Military personnel from Istanbul
Defence ministers of Serbia
Foreign ministers of Serbia
Serbian Catholics